Zizi is a personal name or nickname which may refer to:

Zizi Jeanmaire (1924–2020), French ballet dancer
Zizi Lambrino (1898–1953), the first wife of King Carol II of Romania
Zizi Possi, Brazilian singer
Zizi Roberts (born 1979), Liberian football player
Zinedine Zidane, French footballer
Zheng Zhi, Chinese footballer
Zizi Adel, Egyptian singer
Farid Zizi, French Civil Servant

See also
Zamioculcas zamiifolia
Zizzi

hu:Zizi